El Buur is a town located in the state of Galmudug in central Somalia. It was formerly the capital of the Galgaduud region.

Clan murusade.

El buur is a city in the Galguduud region of Galmudug state in central Somalia.

Residents 
El Buur has been inhabited since at least the 13th century. During the Ajuran Sultanate it served as a local commercial hub.

The area is particularly noted as a center for quarrying. Here, meerschaum (sepiolite), used to make the Somali people's trademark dabqaad incense burner, is mined. El Buur is also the site of the local pipe-making industry.

This city is inhabited by the Murusade clan.

External links

References 

Populated places in Galguduud
Galmudug
Mining communities in Africa
Mining in Somalia